Andricus pattersonae, also known as the plate gall wasp, is a species of gall-forming wasp in the genus Andricus. Their hosts are among the white oaks grouping of oaks, with blue oak being common.

Like most oak gall wasps, the plate gall wasp has two alternating generations a year: a parthenogenic all-female generation, and a bisexual generation. The all-female generation produces galls in summer that are flat and circular with scalloped edges. Attached to the underside of leaves, these galls are initially green, then yellow, and fade to brown. They are 7-9 mm in diameter and have a single larval chamber. Adults emerge in spring. The bisexual generation's galls are pear-shaped and much smaller.

References

External links 
 Andricus pattersonae on gallformers

Cynipidae
Gall-inducing insects
Oak galls